Livinallongo del Col di Lana is a comune (municipality) in the Province of Belluno in the Italian region Veneto, located about  north of Venice and about  northwest of Belluno.

Ninety percent of the population speak Ladin as their native language.

Twin towns
Livinallongo del Col di Lana is twinned with:

  Gubbio, Italy, since 2014

References

Tyrol (region)
Cities and towns in Veneto
Ladinia